Luis Miguel Aparecido Alves (born May 25, 1985), known as Gugu, is a Brazilian football player currently playing for Iraklis Psachna F.C.

External links

1985 births
Living people
Brazilian footballers
Thrasyvoulos F.C. players
Ionikos F.C. players
Super League Greece players
Expatriate footballers in Greece
Brazilian expatriate footballers
Association football midfielders